Dinotopia is an American television series based on the series of illustrated books of the same name by James Gurney, in which three Americans have crash-landed a plane and found themselves on a remote uncharted island inhabited by people and dinosaurs.

Outline
US pilot Frank Scott, with his sons Karl and David, crash-lands a light plane in a tropical storm and they find themselves on an English-speaking island called Dinotopia, remote and undiscovered, where people live alongside dinosaurs, mostly peacefully.

The Scotts settle at Waterfall City, capital of Dinotopia, which then is affected by the arrival of a group called the Outsiders, who live outside the laws of Dinotopia. The Outsiders pose less of a danger than the featured Saurian antagonists, such as Pteranodon, Tyrannosaurus, and Postosuchus.

Production
The series was produced as a sequel to the miniseries Dinotopia, broadcast in early 2002, and thirteen new episodes were filmed. None of the cast of the mini-series returned to their roles. Location shooting lasted for three months near Budapest, Hungary. Georgina Rylance played Marion Waldo, and Lisa Zane her friend Le Sage, leader of the Outsiders. Michael Brandon, Jonathan Hyde, and Erik von Detten also star in the series.

ABC first planned to launch the series in September 2002, but in the event waited until Thanksgiving in November. The network was disappointed by the 5.7 million viewers for Episode 1, but stated that it had been an "odd viewing night overall" and continued to broadcast the show. However, in December the viewing figures had not improved enough to satisfy the ABC network, and the series was canceled, with the result that only six of the thirteen episodes were aired on ABC, although all thirteen were broadcast in Europe in 2003.

Artisan Entertainment released the whole series on Region 1 DVD on January 20, 2004.  This release was later discontinued and went out of print, but on March 15, 2016, Mill Creek Entertainment re-released the series on Region 1 DVD and also on Region 2 DVD in Europe.

Cast
Erik von Detten as Karl Scott
Shiloh Strong as David Scott
Michael Brandon as Frank Scott
Omid Djalili as the voice of Zipeau
Sophie Ward as Rosemary Waldo
Lisa Zane as Le Sage
Jonathan Hyde as Mayor Waldo
Georgina Rylance as Marion Waldo
Sian Brooke as Krista
Zoltan Papp as Martino
Zoltán Seress as Quint

Episodes

Dinosaurs
 Ankylosaurus
 Brachiosaurus ("Brach")
 Chasmosaurus (incorrectly classified as a hadrosaur)
 Parasaurolophus ("Overlander"/Guard)
 Mosasaurus (more crocodilian in appearance than in the fossil record, with arms and legs instead of flippers)
 Postosuchus
 Pteranodon
 Quetzalcoatlus ("Skybax")
 Stegosaurus one makes a cameo during the first episode and has a bigger role in episode 3
 Dunkleosteus (resembles more of an eel-like creature than in real life, with spikes on its face instead of armor plating)
 Stenonychosaurus
 Tyrannosaurus rex
 Triceratops (mentioned by Captain Oonu after the first Tyrannosaurus attack)
 Dimorphodon (portrayed inaccurately as a feathered bird)

Notes

External links
 

Dinotopia
American Broadcasting Company original programming
2002 American television series debuts
2003 American television series endings
Television shows based on American novels
Television series about dinosaurs